Albert Kish (14 May 1937 – 23 October 2015) was a Canadian documentarian/filmmaker.

Life and career 

Kish was born in Albert Kiss in Eger, Hungary, the son of Olga Weisz, a clothing store manager, and Albert Kiss, a customs officer. He became interested in film at an early age and was attending the Academy of Drama and Film in Budapest when the Hungarian Revolution of 1956 forced his family to leave Hungary. They moved to Montreal in 1956 and changed their name to 'Kish'.

Kish found work as a photographer and, in 1964, was hired as an editor at the CBC. In 1967, he was hired by the Canadian National Railway to photograph trains for Expo 67. National Film Board of Canada director John Howe liked his work and offered him a job. Kish stayed with the NFB until his retirement in 1997, directing, producing and/or editing 33 films.

Outside of the NFB, Kish made three films with Bashar Shbib. He also maintained a life-long interest in photography, and his photographs have appeared in several publications and exhibitions.

Personal life and death
In 1994, Kish married engineer Katalin Futo. He died of cancer at Toronto General Hospital on October 23, 2015 and was survived by his wife and two sons.

Filmography 
(All for the National Film Board of Canada)

Flight in White - documentary short, William Canning 1968 - editor 
Juggernaut - documentary short, Eugene Boyko 1968 - editor 
Ports Canada - documentary short 1969 - director, editor
Freeze-in - documentary short, F. Whitman Trecartin 1970 - producer, editor	
Bighorn - documentary short, Bill Schmalz 1970 - editor
Occupation - documentary, Bill Reid 1970 - editor
Search into White Space - documentary short, James Carney 1970 - editor 
Family House - documentary short, Laurence Hyde 1970 - photographer 
City Limits - documentary short, Laurence Hyde 1971 - photographer 
This is a Photograph - documentary short 1971 - director, editor, photographer 
Atomic Juggernaut - documentary short, Eugene Boyko 1971 - editor
Time Piece - documentary short 1971 - director, editor, writer
Bannerfilm - documentary short, Donald Winkler 1972 - editor
Louisbourg - documentary short 1972 - director, editor 
Our Street was Paved with Gold - documentary short 1973 - director, editor 
In Praise of Hands - documentary short, Donald Winkler 1974 - editor 
Los Canadienses - documentary 1975 - director, writer, editor 
Bekevar Jubilee - documentary short 1977 - director, writer, editor 
Hold the Ketchup - documentary short 1977 - director, editor 
Paper Wheat - documentary 1979 - director, editor	
The Image Makers - documentary 1980 - director, writer, editor	
Conspiracy of Silence - documentary short, Nelu Ghiran 1981 - editor 
 F.R. Scott: Rhyme and Reason - documentary, Donald Winkler 1982 - editor
Muscle - documentary short, Barry Lank 1983 - editor
The Age of Invention - short film 1984 - director, producer, editor 
The Scholar in Society: Northrop Frye in Conversation - documentary short, Donald Winkler 1984 - editor 
Age of the Rivers - documentary 1986 - director, writer, editor 
Al Purdy: A Sensitive Man - documentary, Donald Winkler 1988 - editor
Notman's World - documentary short 1989 - director, editor
To the Queen Mother from Canada with Love - documentary short 1990 - director, editor
Litrosi - documentary, Maria K. Daskalos 1993 - editor
The Summer of '67 - documentary 1994 - producer, editor and (with Donald Winkler) director
Louisbourg Under Siege - documentary 1997 - director, editor

With Chbib Productions
Bread - short film 1985 - director, editor
Clair Obscur - feature, Bashar Shbib 1988 - editor
Full of Grace - short film, Shernold Edwards 2006 - editor

Awards

Ports Canada (1969)
 Gold Camera Award, U.S. Industrial Film Festival, Chicago 1970

This is a Photograph (1971)
 Genie Award for Best Theatrical Short Film, 24th Canadian Film Awards, Toronto 1972
 Canadian Film Award - Best Sound Re-recording, 24th Canadian Film Awards, Toronto 1972
 Silver Medal, Venice Film Festival, Venice 1973

Los Canadienses (1975)
 BAFTA Award for Best Documentary (Robert Flaherty Award), British Academy of Film & Television Arts, London 1976
 Silver Hugo Award, Chicago International Film Festival 1976
 Special Award for Best Television Film, and Special Mention by the International Federation of Film Critics, International Week of Cinema, Mannheim, Germany 1976
 Best Documentary Film, Yorkton Film Festival, Yorkton, Saskatchewan 1976
 Blue Ribbon Award, International History & Culture, American Film Festival, New York  1977
 TV Award, Best film made specifically for TV, Melbourne Film Festival, Australia 1977

Paper Wheat (1979)
 Chris Award, Business and Industry, Columbus International Film & Animation Festival, Columbus, Ohio 1979
 Certificate for Outstanding Film, Hong Kong International Film Festival, Hong Kong 1980

The Age of Invention (1984)
 Blue Ribbon Award, Visual Essays, American Film Festival, New York 1985

Bread (1985)
 Blue Ribbon Award, Social Studies, American Film Festival, New York 1984
 Special Mention, San Francisco International Film Festival 1984
 Second Prize, Documentary, Alicante Film Festival, Alicante, Spain 1985

Notman's World (1989)
 Gold Apple Award, 2lst Annual Educational Film and Video Festival, Oakland, California 1991
 Honourable Mention, Art & Culture, Columbus International Film & Animation Festival, Columbus, Ohio 1991

References

External links 
 Lyn Martin; "The NFB: Inventing Canada – Again?" 
 Loren R Lerner; "Canadian Film and Video A Bibliography and Guide to the Literature, Volume 2"
  Films by Albert Kish on NFB.ca

2015 deaths
1937 births
Film directors from Montreal
Anglophone Quebec people
National Film Board of Canada people